The D. Horace Tilton House is a historic house at 379 Albion Street in Wakefield, Massachusetts.  The -story wood-frame house is a well-preserved small Federal-style house built in the later years of the 18th century, when the area was part of Stoneham.  Four bays wide, its front door has a later Greek Revival surround, around which time its upper-level windows may also have been added.  The house belonged to D. Horace Tilton, a shoemaker.

The house was listed on the National Register of Historic Places in 1989.

See also
National Register of Historic Places listings in Wakefield, Massachusetts
National Register of Historic Places listings in Middlesex County, Massachusetts

References

Houses on the National Register of Historic Places in Wakefield, Massachusetts
Federal architecture in Massachusetts
Houses completed in 1726
Houses in Wakefield, Massachusetts
1726 establishments in Massachusetts